Speak Your Mind is a 2018 album by Anne-Marie.

Film, radio and TV
Speak Your Mind, early Canadian radio talk show hosted by Larry Solway then John Gilbert 
Speak Your Mind, film starring Paul Nicholas Mason

Music

Albums
Speak Your Mind, a 2008 album by Ian Kelly
Speak Your Mind, a 2009 album by Cindy Valentine
Speak Your Mind, a 2014 album by The/Das

Songs
"Speak Your Mind", a 1972 song by Yvonne Elliman from Yvonne Elliman, originally by Marc Benno
"Speak Your Mind", song by 12 Stones from Potter's Field
"Speak Your Mind", song by The Toasters from Hard Band for Dead
"Speak Your Mind", song by Immortal Technique from Revolutionary Vol. 1
"Speak Your Mind", song by Glenn Hughes from Feel
"Speak Your Mind", song by Kevin Moore from Rainmaker
"Speak Your Mind", song by Biro Funk
"Speak Your Mind", song by Joe Firstman from The War of Women

Other
Speak Your Mind, a 2007 book by Dmitry Gordon